Jan Zajíček (born January 26, 1951) is a Czechoslovak former professional ice hockey defenceman.

Zajíček played 312 games in the Czechoslovak First Ice Hockey League for TJ Gottwaldov, TJ Sparta ČKD Praha and TJ Zetor Brno. He was also a member of the Czechoslovakia national ice hockey team and played in the 1978 Ice Hockey World Championships.

References

External links

1951 births
Living people
EHC Basel players
HC Benátky nad Jizerou players
Czechoslovak ice hockey defencemen
HK Dukla Trenčín players
SHK Hodonín players
HC Kometa Brno players
People from Uherský Ostroh
HC Sparta Praha players
PSG Berani Zlín players
Czech ice hockey defencemen
Sportspeople from the Zlín Region
Czechoslovak expatriate sportspeople in Switzerland
Czechoslovak expatriate ice hockey people
Expatriate ice hockey players in Switzerland